Dave Culross (born March 9, 1974 in Rochester, New York) is an American drummer.  He was a member of Malevolent Creation, Culross has played drums in many death metal bands, such as Suffocation, Mortician, Incantation, HatePlow, Pyrexia, Gorgasm, and Disgorged.

Discography
 Disgorged, Thy Hideous Wake (1993) EP independent release
 Malevolent Creation, Eternal (1995) LP Pavement Music
 Malevolent Creation, Joe Black (1996) LP Pavement Music
 Malevolent Creation, The Fine Art of Murder (1998) LP Pavement Music
 Suffocation, Despise the Sun (1998) EP Vulture Entertainment/Relapse Records
 Hate Plow, The Only Law is Survival (2000) LP Arctic Records
 Incantation, The Infernal Storm (2000) LP Relapse Records
 Gorgasm, Bleeding Profusely (2000) LP Extremities Records
 Hate Plow, Mosh Pit Murder (2001) (Live) LP Arctic Records
 Malevolent Creation, Envenomed (2001) LP Arctic Records
 Malevolent Creation, Envenomed II (2002) LP Arctic Records
 Malevolent Creation, Manifestation (2003) LP Crash Records
 Malevolent Creation, Warkult (2004) LP Nuclear Blast Records
 Malevolent Creation, Doomsday X (2007) LP Nuclear Blast/Massacre Records
 Malevolent Creation, Live at The Whiskey A Go-Go (2008) Arctic Records
 Suffocation, Pinnacle of Bedlam (2013) Nuclear Blast Records
 Pyrexia, Feast of Iniquity - tracks 1, 3, 7, 10 (2013) LP Unique Leader Records

External links
Sick Drummer Magazine

Culross, Dave
American heavy metal drummers
Musicians from Buffalo, New York
Living people
Death metal musicians
People from Shirley, New York
American male drummers
20th-century American drummers
Malevolent Creation members
Suffocation (band) members
21st-century American drummers
20th-century American male musicians
21st-century American male musicians